Theodoulos or Theodulus (amongst other variations) is a Greek masculine given name. The name is a theophoric name, meaning "servant of God" - in a similar construction to Christodoulos.

People with the given name

Bishops, saints and martyrs
 Theodulus of Grammont (d. c. 400), bishop of Sion
 Leontius, Hypatius and Theodulus, Christian martyrs
 A saint and son of Nilus of Sinai
 A saint martyred at Synnada
 A saint and martyr with Anesius in Africa
 A saint martyred with Pope Alexander I
 One of the martyred sons of martyrs Exuperius and Zoe

Others
 Theodoulos Parsakoutenos (fl. 960s), Byzantine general

People with the surname
 Michael Theodoulou

See also
 Abdullah, an Arabic name with the same meaning
 Eclogue of Theodulus, a Latin verse dialogue
 Obadiah, a Hebrew name with the same meaning
 Theodul Pass
 Theodul Glacier
 Theodula of Anazarbus
 Théodule

References

Greek masculine given names